North Dakota was admitted to the Union on November 2, 1889.

The current dean of the North Dakota delegation is Senator John Hoeven, having served in the Senate since 2011.

United States Senate

United States House of Representatives

Key

See also

 List of United States congressional districts
 North Dakota's congressional districts 
 Political party strength in North Dakota

References

North Dakota
Lists of North Dakota politicians